Ziwa Rhino Sanctuary is a private, non-profit, animal sanctuary in Uganda. Established in 2005 to re-introduce Southern White Rhinos in the wild, the sanctuary is the only place in the country, where one can observe these endangered creatures in the wild. The sanctuary is collaborative effort between Ziwa Rhino and Wildlife Ranch, who own the land on which the sanctuary sits and the Uganda Wildlife Authority, the government agency responsible for protecting Uganda's wildlife resources. As of June 2021, the ranch was home to 33 rhinos.

Location
This location is near Mukerenge Village, Nakasongola District, in the Kafu River Basin, off of the Kampala–Gulu Highway. The geographical coordinates of the ranch are:1°29'08.0"N, 32°05'43.0"E (Latitude:1.485556; Longitude:32.095278).

Overview

Ziwa Rhino Sanctuary is a collaborative effort between the Uganda Wildlife Authority, and Ziwa Rhino and Wildlife Ranch Limited, a private land management company committed to the restoration of Uganda's rhinoceros population. The sanctuary offers a secure place where rhino populations can be expanded by breeding, protected from human and non-human predators and gradually re-introduced into Uganda's national parks, while at the same time, allowing the public to enjoy these majestic animals, as the project moves forward.

A team of approximately 78 park rangers and security guards keep watch on the rhinos 24 hours daily, seven days a week, to ensure their safety. The  sanctuary is surrounded by a  electric fence to keep the rhinos in and the intruders out. The sanctuary is home to at least 40 mammal and reptilian species including monkeys, antelopes, hippopotamuses, crocodiles and numerous bird species. Tourist facilities at the sanctuary include a safari lodge, guest house, budget accommodation, and camp grounds. The accommodations are two separate businesses and both have restaurants that offer meals to tourists. In addition to on foot rhino trekking, tourist activities include birding, canoe rides and nature walks.

History
Both the Black Rhinoceros (Diceros bicornis michaeli) and the Northern white rhinoceros (Ceratotherium simum cottoni), are indigenous to Uganda. However, due to a number of factors, including prolonged armed human conflict, poaching and the mismanagement of their natural habitat, by 1982, both species had been wiped out in the country. Ziwa Rhino sanctuary was established in 2005 to reintroduce the southern white rhinoceros to Uganda. The long-term goal of the sanctuary is to "build a sustainable rhinoceros population and relocate rhinos back to their original habitat in Uganda's protected areas". As of January 2010, Ziwa Rhino Sanctuary was the only location in Uganda, where rhinos can be observed in their natural habitat.

Starting with a total of six animals, four that were bought from Solio Ranch in Kenya and two donated from Disney's Animal Kingdom in Orlando, Florida, in the United States, the rhino population had grown to thirteen as of June 2013. Following the birth of another calf in April 2014, the total rhino population at Ziwa Ranch rose to 15. As of March 2018, the rhino numbers at the sanctuary had increased to twenty-two animals, and 33 in December 2021

See also
 Uganda National Parks

References

External links

 Official Website

Animal sanctuaries
Nakasongola District
Protected areas of Uganda
Dairo Air Services
2005 establishments in Uganda